The Road of Life is a 1956 Mexican drama film directed by Alfonso Corona Blake. At the 6th Berlin International Film Festival it won the Honourable Mention (Director) award.

Cast

 Luis Alba
 Guillermo Bravo Sosa
 Antonio Brillas
 José Chávez
 Rafael Estrada
 Carmen Funés
 Eufrosina García
 Guido García
 Ignacio García Torres
 Rafael González
 Mario Humberto Jiménez Pons
 Rogelio 'Frijolitos' Jiménez Pons
 Enrique Lucero
 Miguel Manzano
 Roberto Meyer
 Eduardo Moreno
 Inés Murillo
 Mario Navarro
 Ismael Pérez
 Víctor Pérez

References

External links

1956 films
1950s Spanish-language films
1956 crime drama films
Films directed by Alfonso Corona Blake
Mexican black-and-white films
Mexican crime drama films
1950s Mexican films